Multicam (LSM) is software developed by the Belgian company EVS Broadcast Equipment. Combined with its remote controller, it allows controlling the XT3 video server.

This software and the production server allows broadcasters to record, control and play media. Originally developed for sports production, the XT[2] is now present in nearly each OB van in all last big sportive events as FIFA World Cup, IFAF World Cup, MotoGP and Olympic Games and is actually used in the biggest studio broadcasts such as NBC, France 2, CCTV and many others.

The multicam LSM's features are Instant replay, slow-motion, High-motion, super motion, Rough cut, editing, video playlist and content management.

Combined with the remote controller, it allows users to instantly make clips of ingested media, review multiple camera angles and replay them at any speed between -400 and + 400% at a very high quality (HD or SD).

This software and its widely known controller have become a standard, as part of each OB Van in sport productions. The LSM name has been adopted as the name of the person in charge of making the slow-motion replays (LSM Operator) in countries other than the United States. Today, there are approximately 5,000 LSM operators in the world.

In the United States, Germany and Norway, the LSM is commonly referred to as an EVS or Elvis, and operators as EVS operators, despite the fact that EVS manufactures other products besides the LSM.

References 
 4rfv.com
 TVTechnology
 EVS Bring Olympics to Life For Chinese TV from 4rfv
 Olympics Hits New Media from TVTechnology
  Canal 13 Trusts EVS For Covering The 2008 Olympics from BroadcastbuyerTV
 Beijing Olympics: NBC's Multiplatform Push from BroadcastingCable

External links 
 EVS Official Website
 Operators' Lounge: social website allowing LSM operators to exchange technical information

Broadcast engineering
Video